Abadiu of Antinoe was a bishop of Antinoe (part of modern-day Egypt) in the Fourth Century. He is commemorated as a saint in the Coptic Orthodox Church, and is said to have been killed in a theological dispute with the Arians. His feast day is December 26. He is referenced in Les Martyrs d'Égypte by Hippolyte Delehaye.

References

Sources
Holweck, F. G. A Biographical Dictionary of the Saint. St. Louis, MO: B. Herder Book Co. 1924.

4th-century Christian martyrs
Year of birth unknown
Year of death unknown
4th-century Egyptian bishops